Antinephele is a genus of moths in the family Sphingidae erected by William Jacob Holland in 1889.

Species
Antinephele achlora Holland, 1892
Antinephele anomala (Butler, 1882)
Antinephele camerunensis Clark, 1937
Antinephele efulani Clark, 1926
Antinephele lunulata Rothschild & Jordan, 1903
Antinephele maculifera Holland, 1889
Antinephele marcida Holland, 1893
Antinephele muscosa Holland, 1889

References

 
Macroglossini
Moth genera
Taxa named by William Jacob Holland